Arcozelo may refer to the following places in Portugal:

Arcozelo (Barcelos), a parish in the municipality of Barcelos
Arcozelo (Gouveia), a parish in the municipality of Gouveia 
Arcozelo (Ponte de Lima), a parish in the municipality of Ponte de Lima
Arcozelo (Vila Nova de Gaia), a parish in the municipality of Vila Nova de Gaia 
Arcozelo (Vila Verde), a parish in Vila Verde Municipality

See also
Arcozelos, a parish in the municipality of Moimenta da Beira